Raymond Ernest Wood (11 June 1931 – 7 July 2002) was an English professional footballer who played as a goalkeeper. Representing Manchester United, he played in the 1956 and 1957 Football League championship-winning teams.

Known for his pace and agility, Wood had the opportunity to be a professional sprinter, but opted instead to play football. He played for England at international level on three occasions between 1954 and 1956 and, after retiring from playing in 1968, managed football clubs in the US, Cyprus, Greece, Kenya and the United Arab Emirates.

Playing career

Wood started his career as an amateur with Newcastle United, though he failed to make a first team appearance and moved to Darlington in 1949. He only stayed for three months though before joining Manchester United, making his first team debut against Newcastle at Old Trafford in the league on 3 December 1949. Over the next few seasons he gradually displaced the ageing Jack Crompton as United's first choice goalkeeper.

During the 1957 FA Cup Final against Aston Villa, Wood was the victim of what was then a perfectly legal shoulder charge. In the sixth minute of the game Wood successfully claimed a cross; however, Villa outside-left Peter McParland clattered into him, breaking Wood's jaw due to him ducking to avoid the challenge. As this game was played in the era before substitutes Jackie Blanchflower was forced to play in goal following the incident, Wood eventually came back on after treatment to play as a forward, United went on to lose the game 2–1. His compensation for this was a Football League First Division title medal to add to the first medal he had gained a year earlier.

In 1954, when only 23 years old, he was selected to play for the England team.

In December 1957, United signed Harry Gregg from Doncaster Rovers for £23,500 – the world record fee for a goalkeeper at the time – and Wood found his first-team opportunities limited.

Wood was among the survivors of the Munich air disaster on 6 February 1958, suffering minor injuries, but played just one first-team game afterwards and was later sold to Huddersfield Town within a year. He spent seven seasons at Huddersfield, playing more than 250 first-team games, although he was unable to help them win promotion to the First Division. In 1965, he played in the Eastern Canada Professional Soccer League with Toronto Inter-Roma. He then played one season at Bradford City, before finishing his career with two seasons at Barnsley.

Several years after leaving Manchester United, Matt Busby unsuccessfully tried to re-sign him for Manchester United when Harry Gregg was injured.

Managerial career
He continued as a manager in several countries including United States, Ireland, Zambia, Canada, Greece, Kenya, Kuwait and United Arab Emirates. He coached Cyprus and Kenya national football teams. He also coached the NASL team Los Angeles Wolves and the Cypriot team APOEL in 1971–72.

Personal life
Wood married his wife Elizabeth in 1954. They had two daughters, but the couple divorced during the 1970s. He died in July 2002 aged 71 in Bexhill-on-Sea, having returned to England after the end of his coaching career overseas. His death was the result of a heart attack.

Honours
Manchester United
Football League First Division: 1951–52, 1955–56, 1956–57
FA Charity Shield: 1952, 1956, 1957

References

External links
 Obituary, The Independent

 

1931 births
2002 deaths
People from Hebburn
Footballers from Tyne and Wear
Association football goalkeepers
English footballers
England international footballers
England under-23 international footballers
Newcastle United F.C. players
Darlington F.C. players
Manchester United F.C. players
Huddersfield Town A.F.C. players
Toronto Roma players
Bradford City A.F.C. players
Barnsley F.C. players
English Football League players
Eastern Canada Professional Soccer League players
English football managers
Cyprus national football team managers
Survivors of aviation accidents or incidents
Expatriate football managers in Kenya
Kenya national football team managers
North American Soccer League (1968–1984) coaches
English expatriate football managers
Expatriate football managers in Cyprus
APOEL FC managers
English Football League representative players
Trikala F.C. managers
FA Cup Final players